Azerbaijani Flag Order is an award presented by the President of the Republic of Azerbaijan.

History and status
Azerbaijani Flag order was among several medals and orders, requested to be reviewed and created by the President Abulfaz Elchibey on November 10, 1992 by a Presidential Decree No. 370. The order was created by the Decree No. 756 of the President of Azerbaijan, Heydar Aliyev and ratified by National Assembly of Azerbaijan on December 6, 1993. The Azerbaijani Flag Order is given to the citizens of Republic of Azerbaijan, foreign nationals and non-citizens for the following services:
long lasting contributions to restoration of independence of Azerbaijan;
special contributions to the social and political development;
distinguished contributions to the military science and development of military equipment;
distinguished acts in defending the territorial integrity of Azerbaijan Republic;
distinguished service in keeping the order in the country;
protecting borders of the country and distinguished military service.

The order is pinned to the left side of the chest. If there are any other orders or medals, the Azerbaijani Flag Order follows Shah Ismail Order (Order of Shah Ismail).

Description
Azerbaijani Flag order is made of two layers of silver plates in the form of eight pointed stars bathed in pure gold, with composition of national ornaments. The bottom layer is colored in white and the top one is colored in blue stripes. The striped come towards the center, onto another layer depicted in form of Azerbaijani flag, colored in its blue, red and green colors.
The rear side of the order is polished and has an engraved order number and words Azərbaycan Bayrağı.

The composition is attached to a blue-red-green colored watered silk ribbon bar with five edges.

Recipients 

Zakir Garalov, General Prosecutor of Azerbaijan
Kamaladdin Heydarov, Minister of Emergency Situations of Azerbaijan
Servicemen of Azerbaijani Armed Forces
Servicemen of the Ministry of National Security of Azerbaijan Republic
Ibad Huseynov, National Hero of Azerbaijan
Ramil Usubov, Minister of Internal Affairs of Azerbaijan
Eldar Mahmudov, Minister of National Security
Shahin Sultanov, Commander of the Azerbaijani Navy
Tofig Aghahuseynov, Commander of the Baku Air Defense District

References

Orders, decorations, and medals of Azerbaijan
Awards established in 1993
1993 establishments in Azerbaijan